The M 17 was a German single-engine high-wing sports monoplane. It was designed by Willy Messerschmitt in 1925 in Bamberg. This aircraft won many competitions and allowed Willy Messerschmitt to build his first factory.

Development
The design of the M 17 could be traced back via the powered S 16 and S 15 aircraft to the Messerschmitt-Hirth S 14 glider. The aircraft was a two-seater almost completely made of wood and weighed only 198 kg (437 lb). The engine was a 22 kW (29 hp) Bristol Cherub II. The pilot had no forward visibility.

In September 1926, pilot Eberhard von Conta, and the writer Werner von Langsdorff flew in an M 17 from Bamberg to Rome. This marked the first time the central Alps were crossed with a light aircraft. The flight lasted more than 14 hours and they had to refuel every three hours, since the tank could hold only 28 L (7 US gal). They reached an altitude of 4,500 m (14,760 ft).

Survivors/Replicas
Only one of the six-eight machines built survived and is today in the Deutsches Museum in Munich.

A replica was built by the Messerschmitt Foundation (first flight April 14, 2004) and makes regular appearances at the International Aerospace Exhibition in Berlin. It weighs 40 kg (90 lb) more than the original due to additional equipment (radio and rescue system) and is now at the  Manching Aviation Museum in Ingolstadt, Bavaria.

Specifications

See also

References

External links

M-17 at Ugolok Neba - photos and drawings

M 17
1920s German sport aircraft
Articles containing video clips
Single-engined tractor aircraft
High-wing aircraft
Aircraft first flown in 1925